Louis-Pierre-Eugène Amélie Sédillot  (23 June 1808 in Paris – 2 December 1875), was a French orientalist and historian of science and mathematics.

Biography
His father, orientalist and astronomer, worked alongside Delambre and Laplace.  His older brother, Charles-Emmanuel Sédillot, became a renowned surgeon. Louis-Pierre-Eugene also showed predispositions towards study. He began his career as a history teacher before becoming Secretary of the Collège de France and the School of Oriental Languages in 1832.

Selected works
Manuel de la Bourse, contenant des notions exactes sur les effets publics français et étrangers, avec l'état de leur cours respectif depuis l'origine ; sur les affaires qui se traitent à la Bourse de Paris, 1829
 Traité des instruments astronomiques des Arabes composé au treizième siècle par Aboul Hhassan Ali, de Maroc, intitulé Collection des commencements et des fins, traduit de l'arabe sur le manuscrit 1147 de la Bibliothèque royale par J.-J. Sédillot, et publié par L.-Am. Sédillot, 2 volumes, 1834–1835
Manuel classique de chronologie, 2 volumes, 1834–1850
Mémoire sur les instruments astronomiques des Arabes, 1841
Mémoire sur les systèmes géographiques des Grecs et des Arabes, 1842
Supplément au Traité des instruments astronomiques des Arabes, 1844
Matériaux pour servir à l'histoire comparée des sciences mathématiques chez les Grecs et les Orientaux, 2 volumes, 1845–1849
Prolégomènes des tables astronomiques d'Oloug-Beg, publiés avec notes et variantes et précédés d'une introduction, 1847
Histoire des Arabes, 1854 ; 1877. Reprint: Plan-de-la-Tour : Éd. d'Aujourd'hui, coll. « Les Introuvables », 1984
Mémoire sur l'origine de nos chiffres, 1865
Les Professeurs de mathématiques et de physique générale au Collège de France, 1869. Reprint: Ann Arbor : UMI, 1992

External links
Biography 

Historians of science
French historians of mathematics
French orientalists
19th-century French historians
1808 births
1875 deaths
French male non-fiction writers
19th-century French male writers